Cavernocymbium is a genus of North American tangled nest spiders first described by D. Ubick in 2005.  it contains only two species, both found in United States.

References

External links

Amaurobiidae
Araneomorphae genera
Spiders of the United States